McLeansboro is a city in Hamilton County, Illinois, United States. The population was 2,675 at the 2020 census. The estimated population as of 2018 was 2,773. It is the county seat of Hamilton County.

McLeansboro is part of the Mount Vernon, Illinois micropolitan area.

Geography

History
The city was named for Dr. William McLean, an early settler who had resided there in 1821.

Demographics

As of the census of 2000, there were 2,945 people, 1,265 households, and 747 families residing in the city. The racial makeup of the city was 98.10% White, 0.78% African American, 0.03% Native American, 0.20% Asian, 0.03% Pacific Islander, 0.17% from other races, and 0.68% from two or more races. Hispanic or Latino of any race were 0.37% of the population.

There were 1,265 households, out of which 26.0% had children under the age of 18 living with them, 44.6% were married couples living together, 11.1% had a female householder with no husband present, and 40.9% were non-families. 38.4% of all households were made up of individuals, and 23.9% had someone living alone who was 65 years of age or older.  The average household size was 2.19 and the average family size was 2.91.

In the city, the population was spread out, with 22.8% under the age of 18, 8.3% from 18 to 24, 22.7% from 25 to 44, 20.6% from 45 to 64, and 25.7% who were 65 years of age or older.  The median age was 42 years. For every 100 females there were 81.3 males.  For every 100 females age 18 and over, there were 74.4 males.

The median income for a household in the city was $22,183, and the median income for a family was $35,296. Males had a median income of $35,114 versus $18,125 for females. The per capita income for the city was $15,354. About 11.9% of families and 19.7% of the population were below the poverty line, including 34.7% of those under age 18 and 8.6% of those age 65 or over. As of 2015, the median household income was reported at $36,717 and the median family income at $54,430. 18.9% of the population were living below the poverty line.

Notable people

Elwood Barker, businessman, farmer, and Illinois state legislator
Ray Blades, baseball player.
Paul W. Broyles, businessman and Illinois state legislator
Jim Burns, former U. S. Attorney, Inspector General for the Illinois Secretary of State from 2000 until 2020
Christen Drew, news reporter
M. J. Engh, science-fiction author and Roman scholar
Carl Mauck,  former center for the Houston Oilers and National Football League coach
Rodney K. Miller, television host for Small Town Big Deal
Jerry Sloan, Basketball Hall of Famer, player and head coach for the Chicago Bulls and head coach of the Utah Jazz
H. Allen Smith, author
John H. Stelle, lieutenant governor 1937–40, 29th Governor of Illinois 1940-41, National Commander of the American Legion 1945-46
Henry C. Warmoth, 23rd Governor of Louisiana

See also
Hamilton County Courthouse (Illinois)
1968 Illinois earthquake

References

Further reading
History of Southern Illinois, George Washington Smith, 1912.

External links

Hamilton County Historical Society
Hamilton County Chamber of Commerce

Cities in Hamilton County, Illinois
County seats in Illinois
Cities in Illinois